Hen flea is a common name for several insects and may refer to:
 Ceratophyllus gallinae, also known as the European chicken flea
 Echidnophaga gallinacea, also known as the sticktight flea